Yerly Palma Núñez (born 14 March 2002) is a Cuban footballer who plays as a left back for FC Camagüey and the Cuba women's national team.

Club career
Palma has played for Camagüey in Cuba.

International career
Palma represented Cuba at the 2022 CONCACAF Women's U-20 Championship. She capped at senior level during the 2022 CONCACAF W Championship qualification.

References

2002 births
Living people
Cuban women's footballers
Women's association football fullbacks
FC Camagüey players
Cuba women's international footballers
21st-century Cuban women